The Islamic Information Center is a non-profit 501(c)3 organization that advocates on behalf of humanitarian issues and works to provide authentic Islamic information to non-Muslims. It has been called "one of America's premier Muslim advocacy organizations" and is centered in the National Press Club, a worldwide hub of more than 300 international news organizations, in Washington, DC. The goal of the group is to be complementary to other major Muslim initiatives such as CAIR and MPAC by giving a specific focus to the spiritual and philosophical aspects of Islam. The main purpose of this organization is to provide authentic Islamic information as taught by the Islamic prophet Muhammad and his descendants.

History 
The Islamic Information Center (IIC) is a Washington, DC based NGO was founded in 2002 to help promote the image of Islam in the United States. IIC works primarily with political officials, media agencies, and interfaith organizations to accomplish this goal. 

In 2008, the first IIC chapter was opened in Los Angeles, California, sparking a new national campaign. In 2009, the group opened chapter offices in New York City, New York; and Miami, Florida. In 2010, IIC opened new chapters in Atlanta, Georgia and St. Louis, Missouri.

IIC Chairman
The founder and chairman of the Islamic Information Center, is Imam Syed Naqvi (sometimes referred to as Maulana Naqvi amongst Indian/Pakistani communities). Imam Naqvi is a theologian with at least fifteen years of studies from the various seminaries of the Islamic world. Imam Naqvi is also a spokesperson for the Council of Shia Muslim Scholars Conference and Resident Scholar for the Jaferia Islamic Center ('Idara e Jaferia') in Burtonsville, Maryland.

Board of Advisers
IIC is advised by a special board of premiere US based academics and traditional scholars. These advisers provide valuable insight regarding modern Islamic issues.
 Tariq al-Jamil - Assistant Professor of Religion, Swarthmore College
 Hassan Abbas - Research Fellow, Harvard University
 Vernon Schubel - Professor of Religious Studies, Kenyon College
 Lynda G. Clarke - Department of Religion Associate Professor, Concordia University
 Liyakat Takim - Professor of Religious Studies, University of Denver

Publications

Islam in 60 Seconds
IIC publishes a weekly e-newsletter entitled Islam in 60 Seconds. The newsletter provides brief summaries of world events relating to Muslims, or of particular importance to Muslims. Links to the original news articles are provided, and the paper has often been referred to as the "Fast Food Version" of the news. The newsletter is archived on IIC's webpage.

IIC Monitor
The Monitor is IIC's premiere publication, and is a quarterly news-magazine. The Monitor offers in depth analysis of political, social, and interfaith issues.

References

External links
 Official website
 Official IIC Twitter Account

Political advocacy groups in the United States
Religious activism
Organizations established in 2002
Islamic charities based in the United States
2002 establishments in Washington, D.C.